Brian Irvin (born July 30, 1970) is an American retired sprinter.

References

1970 births
Living people
American male sprinters
Universiade medalists in athletics (track and field)
Place of birth missing (living people)
Universiade gold medalists for the United States
World Athletics Indoor Championships winners
Medalists at the 1991 Summer Universiade